The Principality of Sealand, a micronation founded on a former World War II fort in the North Sea, has issued a number of coins and stamps for collectors. These coins and stamps are denominated in "Sealand dollars" (SX$). Sealand coins can be considered souvenirs only or "rounds" since they do not circulate anywhere and are not accepted as currency by any nation.

History
Sealand began commissioning coins in 1972. The first to be minted was a SX$10 coin with a mintage of 2000. More coins were minted in 1975 and 1977, introducing the SX$20 and SX$100 coins. The SX$10 was minted in 925‰ fine silver, the SX$20 was minted in silver, and the SX$100 was minted in 900‰ fine gold.

In 1991 the "Sealand rebel government" (see Forcible takeover) minted antiqued silver SX$100 coins.

In 1994 the "Treasures of the Sea" Sealand dollars were minted, with an orca (killer whale) on the reverse. The SX$0.25, SX$0.5, SX$1, SX$2.5 and SX$5 were also introduced. The SX$0.25 was minted in bronze and 999‰ fine silver; the SX$0.5 was minted in cupronickel and silver; the SX$1 and SX$2.5 in bronze, silver and gold; and the SX$5 was minted in gold.

Sealand printed stamps in 1969 and 1970.

In 2020, a Sealand stamp was sent into space.

Coins

Error coin
In 1994, fewer than 150 copies of the half dollar were accidentally cut with a scalloped edge instead of the normal reeded one. This is Sealand's only error coin to date. In addition, a mule of a Navy SEALs commemorative medallion was inadvertently struck, by the same private mint that produces Sealand's coins, using the reverse of a Sealandic half dollar. 75 of these were struck before the error was noticed.

Rebel government coin
A rebel government, referring to itself as the "Sealand government in exile", seeking to occupy Sealand, issued a single commemorative coin in 1992.

Stamps

1969: Explorers

 Vasco da Gama 1497 – 2c (later 10c)
 Christopher Columbus 1492 – 3c (later 10c)
 Sir Walter Raleigh 1584 – 5c (later 5c)
 Sir Francis Drake 1588 – 6c (later 10c)
 Captain James Cook 1770 – 14c (later 10c)
 Ferdinand Magellan 1519 – 20c (later 20c)
 Sir Martin Frobisher 1578 – 50c (later 10c)

1970
 Ship – SX$1
 Ships – SX$1
 Edward Teach – SX$1
 Squid – SX$1

1970: Ships
 Ships

1970: Fish
 Fish

1975: International Woman's Year
 Africa – 10c
 Australia – 20c
 Europe – 30c
 Asia – 50c
 America – 90c
 Joan I – SX$1

1977: Sailing ships
 Ship of Ferdinand Magellan 1519 – 10c
 Ship of Vasco da Gama 1497 – 20c
 Ship of Christopher Columbus 1492 – 30c
 Ship of Captain James Cook 1770 – 40c
 Ship of Sir Walter Raleigh 1584 – 50c
 Ship of Sir Martin Frobisher 1578 – 60c
 Ship of Sir Francis Drake 1588 – 70c
 Sealandic Coat of Arms – 80c
 Roy of Sealand – 90c
 Joan of Sealand – SX$1

2010
 Green stamp $3.50
 Red stamp $1.50
 Blue stamp "Inland"

See also
 Cinderella stamp
 List of micronation currencies

Notes and references

External links
General information on the Sealand Dollar
Catalogue of Sealand Coins
Church and East tourism information
Images of Sealandic coins and postage stamps 

Coins and stamps
Cinderella stamps
Exonumia